Allan Salangsang (born October 15, 1976) is a Filipino former professional basketball player. He was drafted twenty-seventh overall by Tanduay in the 2001 PBA draft.

Player profile
Salangsang was drafted 27th overall by Tanduay in the 2001 PBA season. He first played for the Talk 'N Text Phone Pals in the 2004-05 season. In 2006, he was acquired by the Barangay Ginebra Kings. Afterwards, he played for the Coca-Cola Tigers for one year. He was then acquired by the Welcoat Dragons in 2008 from free agency. After the 2009–10 PBA season, he was acquired by the Philippine Patriots for the ASEAN Basketball League (2010–11). He last played for Indonesia Warriors. However, he was released since the team folded in 2014. He is currently the HS men's basketball coach of Siena College of Taytay.

External links
 Player Profile at PBA-Online!

1976 births
Living people
Small forwards
Rain or Shine Elasto Painters players
Letran Knights basketball players
Kapampangan people
Basketball players from Pampanga
Filipino expatriate basketball people in Indonesia
TNT Tropang Giga players
Barangay Ginebra San Miguel players
Powerade Tigers players
Philippines men's national basketball team players
Filipino men's basketball players
Southeast Asian Games gold medalists for the Philippines
Southeast Asian Games medalists in basketball
Competitors at the 2007 Southeast Asian Games
Tanduay Rhum Masters draft picks